Michael Cardinali (born January 14, 1990) is an Italian professional football player.

He made his debut on the professional level in the 2006/07 season for the Serie C1 team Giulianova Calcio.

External links
 
 

1990 births
Living people
Italian footballers
Giulianova Calcio players
ACF Fiorentina players
S.S. Chieti Calcio players
Association football midfielders